A township, in the context of New Jersey local government, refers to one of five types and one of eleven forms of municipal government.  As a political entity, a township in New Jersey is a full-fledged municipality, on par with any town, city, borough, or village. They collect property taxes and provide services such as maintaining roads, garbage collection, water, sewer, schools, police and fire protection.  The Township form of local government is used by 27% of New Jersey municipalities; however, slightly over 50% of the state's population resides within them.

Townships in New Jersey differ from townships elsewhere in the United States. In many states, townships can be an intermediate form of government, between county government and municipalities that are subordinate parts of the township, with different government responsibilities allocated at each level. In New Jersey, there are no subordinate municipalities located within a township, as townships are equivalent to all other forms of local municipalities.

Municipalities in New Jersey may be classified into one of five types, of which townships are one. Townships may retain the township form of government, or adopt one of the modern forms of government, which are not restricted to a particular type of municipality. In New Jersey, a municipality's name (such as X Township) is not necessarily an indication of its form of government.

In New Jersey, the township form of government consists of a three to five member township committee usually elected at-large in partisan elections. At its organization meeting, held after an election, the committee selects one of its elected members to serve as mayor and preside at meetings. The other members of the township committee serve as commissioners of various township departments, overseeing the work of those areas along with overall legislative issues.  Some mayors in this form of government also oversee specific departments.  The mayor in this form of government is primarily ceremonial and has the same power as other township committee members.  The mayor does hold the powers vested in all mayors under state law.  One township committee member is elected deputy mayor each year.  Some towns with this form of government rotate the mayor's office each year, while others elect the same mayor for 2–3 years in a row.

On road signs, township is often abbreviated TWP or Twp.  Some official documents abbreviate it as "Twsp."

History
Historically, a variety of legislation has been passed by the state legislature that has defined and refined the township form of municipal government:

The Township Act of 1798 was the first state legislation to incorporate municipalities.  The government defined was a form of direct democracy, similar to the New England town meeting, in which the vote was available to all white males, at least 21 years old, who were citizens of New Jersey, and residents of the township for at least six months; and who paid taxes in the township, or who owned land, or rented a home in the township for a rent of at least five dollars a year. A group of five freeholders was elected to one-year terms on the Township Committee, which was responsible to oversee the expenditure of revenue in between town meetings.

The Township Act of 1899 abolished the town meeting and strengthened the role of the Township Committee, which was initially set at three and amended to allow for expansion to five members.  Members were elected for staggered three-year terms.

The Home Rule Act of 1917 legally defined the term "municipality" and recognized five types of government: borough, township, city, town, and village and granted each equal legal standing.

The Township Act of 1989 simplified the much-amended Act of 1899.  It retains a three or five member township committee serving staggered terms, whose members are generally elected at-large. The committee elects a mayor from among its members to serve a one-year term.  Partisan elections are allowed under this law. Voters may initiate a referendum to change the membership to consist of either 3 or 5 members. While many township committees directly supervise the operation of their municipality, the revised act allows the committee to delegate all or a portion of its responsibilities to an appointed municipal administrator.

A number of municipalities changed to the Township type, or the Township form of government, between 1979 and 1982. A federal law, The State and Local Fiscal Assistance Act of 1972 provided funding to the states to be divided between state and municipal governments. In 1981, states were removed from the program and the law was amended to provide direct grants to the most popular form of local government in the United States - townships. In Essex County alone, 11 municipal governments changed their form or name to take advantage of the program.

See also

 Township
 Township (United States)
 List of municipalities in New Jersey

References

External links
 New Jersey State League of Municipalities 

Local government in New Jersey